Glenmore Stratton Trenear-Harvey (born 29 December 1940) is a British intelligence analyst who writes, broadcasts and lectures on the subjects of security, intelligence, espionage and terrorism. He is the editor-in-chief of the World Intelligence Review, an associate editor of Eye Spy intelligence magazine, and publisher of Intelligence Digest.

He is an intelligence analyst for Sky News, and also broadcasts on NBC, CNN, Al Jazeera, France 24, Russia Today, and the BBC. He hosted the weekly show Energy World several times, on the satellite channel Press TV. He claims to receive regular briefings from Britain’s Secret Intelligence Service (MI6) and Security Service (MI5) and maintains contact with former (and he claims serving) intelligence officers of the American, British, and former Soviet security and intelligence services.

Biography
A former Royal Air Force pilot, Trenear-Harvey was also a station’s intelligence officer. He then joined the Air Ministry Book Production & Distribution Centre (AMPDC) at Signals Command HQ, RAF Medmenham, distributing codes & ciphers as an Air Ministry courier. During the years 1969 – 1997 he was a contract agent for the Foreign & Commonwealth Office, while pursuing an international career in business and the media in Africa, Asia, Europe and the United States. He acted as campaign manager for Sir James Goldsmith, chairman of the Referendum Party, in his Putney constituency during the UK general election of 1997.
He now runs the consultancy Intel Research, specialising in open source security & intelligence matters. He is a member of the Security & Intelligence Studies Group of the UK Political Association; the Royal United Services Institute for Defence Studies and International Security, the Association of Former Intelligence Officers, and a visiting member of the Woodrow Wilson International Center for Scholars in Washington, D.C.

Honours and appointments
In June 2005, Trenear-Harvey was conferred with a knighthood in the Order of Saints Maurice and Lazarus from the Duke of Savoy. Trenear-Harvey was dubbed by the Earl of Erroll on behalf of the Duke. In 2003, Glenmore Trenear-Harvey was appointed Club Secretary of the reconstituted "IP dining club", inaugurated in 1919 by Sir Vernon Kell for "Intelligence People". In October 2007, he was appointed a Vice-President of the UK National Defence Association.

References

His book Historical Dictionary of Air Intelligence was published by Scarecrow Press Inc, Philadelphia, on 28 March 2009. Historical Dictionary of Atomic Espionage was published in January 2011 and Historical Dictionary of Intelligence Failures on 1 January 2014.

External links 
 What Price National Security? Transcript of discussions at the Freedom Forum, 10 November 2000
 Who's behind poisonings? Trenear-Harvey speaking on MSNBC about the Alexander Litvinenko case

1940 births
Living people
Intelligence analysts